SolarWinds Loggly is a cloud-based log management and analytics service provider based in San Francisco, California. Jon Gifford, Raffael Marty, and Kord Campbell founded the company in 2009, and Charlie Oppenheimer was the CEO of Loggly until its announced acquisition by SolarWinds (as part of the SolarWinds Cloud division of brands) on January 8, 2018.

History
In 2009, Jon Gifford, Raffael Marty, and Kord Campbell founded Loggly. App47, a mobile application management provider, partnered with Loggly in September 2012. The company chose Loggly because of its software-as-a-service (SaaS) deployment option. In September 2013, Loggly released "Generation 2", an updated version of its service. The update included log collection through standard syslog protocols and a graphical web interface that allowed users to use a point-and-click process to find log events and generate charts. That month, Loggly completed a $10.5 million funding round led by Cisco and Data Collective. Trinity Ventures, True Ventures and Matrix Partners also participated in the round.

In October 2014, the company announced a $15 million series C funding round led by Harmony Partners. Matrix Partners, Trinity Ventures, Cisco, Data Collective, and True Ventures also participated. The funding round raised Loggly's total investment funding to $33.4 million. The company released Loggly Dynamic Field Explorer, a new user experience that aims to reduce the time developers spend on identifying and troubleshooting problems, that month.

On January 8, 2018, the company announced that they are now part of SolarWinds.

Operations
Loggly is headquartered in San Francisco, California. The company had 54 employees and 10,000 customers in October 2017. 
Loggly records log data from any device and reports it in a real-time management platform with trend data.

Technology
Loggly is a cloud-based log management service provider. It does not require the use of proprietary software agents to collect log data. The service uses open source technologies, including Elasticsearch, Apache Lucene 4 and Apache Kafka.

See also
 Splunk
 Sumo Logic
 LogDNA
 Logz.io

References

External links
 

Web log analysis software
Bug and issue tracking software
System administration
Data security
Computer security companies
Information technology companies of the United States
Companies based in San Francisco
Technology companies of the United States
Software companies established in 2009
Enterprise software
Defunct software companies of the United States
2018 mergers and acquisitions
2009 establishments in California